Antignano is a comune (municipality) in the Province of Asti in the Italian region Piedmont, located about  southeast of Turin and about  southwest of Asti.

Antignano borders the following municipalities: Celle Enomondo, Costigliole d'Asti, Isola d'Asti, Revigliasco d'Asti, San Damiano d'Asti, and San Martino Alfieri.

References

Cities and towns in Piedmont
Articles which contain graphical timelines